The 1935 Dunedin mayoral election was part of the New Zealand local elections held that same year. In 1935, elections were held for the Mayor of Dunedin plus other local government positions including twelve city councillors. The polling was conducted using the standard first-past-the-post electoral method.

Edwin Cox, the incumbent Mayor, sought re-election and was successful in attaining a second-term. The Labour Party was also successful in securing a majority on the council for the first time.

Mayoral results

Council results

 
 
 
 

 
 

 

 
 
 

 
 
 
 
 
 
 
 

Table footnotes:
<noinclude>

References

Mayoral elections in Dunedin
1935 elections in New Zealand
Politics of Dunedin
1930s in Dunedin